Manindra Reang  is a Tipra-Indian politician from Tripura. He won the election as a  Member of the Tripura Legislative Assembly representing Santirbazar for 2003 to 2013.

He became minister of Minister for Tribal Welfare (TRP & PTG), Home (Jail) and GA (Printing and Stationery) of Tripura from 2003 to 2018....

After defeating in 2018 election Manindra Reang joined Janata Dal (United) in 2019.

In 2022, Manindra Reang joined Tipra Motha.

References

1948 births
Living people